An apartment is a self-contained housing unit that occupies only part of a building.

Apartment may also refer to:

Film and television 
Apartment (film), a 2010 Bollywood film
The Apartment, a 1960 American film
The Apartment (1996 film), a French film directed by Gilles Mimouni
The Apartment (TV series), an Asian reality television series
"The Apartment" (Brooklyn Nine-Nine), a 2014 television episode
"The Apartment" (Full House), a 1993 television episode
"The Apartment" (New Girl), a 2016 television episode
"The Apartment" (Seinfeld), a 1991 television episode
Shinbi Apartment known as Shinbi, a Tooniverse animated television series

Music

Bands and albums 
Apartment (Bristol band), an English post-punk band 1978–1980
Apartment (London band), an English alternative rock band 2005–2010
The Apartments, an Australian indie band
The Apartment (album), by Dexter Gordon, 1974

Songs 
"Apartment" (Kate Miller-Heidke song), 2006
"Apartment" (Young the Giant song), 2012
"Apartment", by Custard from Wisenheimer, 1995
"Apartment", by Seaway from Vacation, 2017
"Apartment", by Shirley Bassey from The Performance, 2009
 Apartment House 1776, a composition by John Cage

Other uses 
Apartment (novel), a 2020 novel by Teddy Wayne
apartment, the name of a concept to handle threading in COM